Stará Turá is a town in the Trenčín Region in western Slovakia.

Geography
It is located in the Myjava Hills close to the Little Carpathians as well as the White Carpathians.

History
The first written record about Stará Turá was in 1392, as a village belonging to the Čachtice Castle. It was part of it until feudalism ceased to exist in the Austro-Hungarian Empire, the Kingdom of Hungary.

In 1467, Matthias Corvinus promoted Stará Turá to the servile town (oppidum),  boosting the town's economy. In 1848, the town was nearly destroyed by fire.

It is mentioned in the popular folk song Teče Voda, Teče.

Demographics
According to the 2001 census, the town had 10,291 inhabitants. 97.4% of inhabitants were Slovaks, 1.7% Czechs and 0.2% Roma. The religious make-up was 45.5% Lutherans, 27.3% Roman Catholics and 23.6% people with no religious affiliation.

Notable people
 Viliam Vagač (1909–1970), SDB, Roman Catholic priest and religious prisoner (sentenced to 18 years in prison).

Twin towns – sister cities

Stará Turá is twinned with:
 Kunovice, Czech Republic

References

External links

 Town website

Cities and towns in Slovakia